Flyers Postgame Live is a television post-game show for Philadelphia Flyers ice hockey games that air locally on NBC Sports Philadelphia (NBCSP). The program features the coach's post-game press conference, player interviews, and game analysis.

Affiliate channels NBC and NBC Sports broadcast a few Flyers games each season nationally, amongst games of other National Hockey League teams. For those games, local Flyers Postgame Live is not aired. Instead, NBC/NBC Sports provides their own post-game shows. However, during the playoffs, especially in later rounds, Flyers Postgame Live is likely to air on NBCSP regardless of what channel airs the game.

Personalities

Hosts 
Ashlyn Sullivan

Analysts 
Scott Hartnell
Al Morganti

References

External links
Comcast SportsNet Philadelphia

Comcast SportsNet original programming
Local sports television programming in the United States
National Hockey League on television
2008 American television series debuts
2010s American television series